99 Ways is the second of two albums released in 1998 by dancehall artist Lady Saw.

Track listing

Charts

References

Lady Saw albums
1998 albums